Goran Gajović (born March 9, 1988) is a Montenegrin professional basketball player who currently plays for CSM Târgu Mureș of the Liga Națională.

References

External links
 Goran Gajovic Player Profile, BCM U Pitesti, International Stats, Events Stats, Game Logs, Awards - RealGM
 
 GAJOVIC, GORAN - Welcome to 7DAYS EuroCup
 Goran Gajovic Player Profile, BCM U FC Arges Pitesti, News, Stats - Eurobasket
 http://www.proballers.com/basket-ball-player/22187/goran-gajovic/career-stats 

1988 births
Living people
KK Sutjeska players
KK Igokea players
Montenegrin men's basketball players
Basketball players from Zagreb
Small forwards